Xin Zhilei is a Chinese actress. She is best known for her roles in films  Bunshinsaba 2, Crosscurrent and Brotherhood of Blades II: The Infernal Battlefield.

Filmography

Film

Television series

Singles

Awards and nominations

References

External links
 

Living people
1986 births
Chinese film actresses
Chinese television actresses
21st-century Chinese actresses
Actresses from Heilongjiang
Central Academy of Drama alumni